Operation Matateh (Mivtza Matateh, lit. Operation Broom) was a Haganah offensive launched ten days before the end of the British Mandate in Palestine. It was a sub-section of Operation Yiftach, with the objectives of capturing the flatlands between Lake Tiberias and Lake Hula and clear the area of Bedouin encampments. It was carried out by Palmach units under the command of Yigal Allon.

Background
The 1942 edition of Steimatzky's "Palestine Guide" describes Hula district as follows: 
"The road passes through several small Arab settlements. All round are Bedouin encampments with mat tents. The Bedouin gather reeds that grow in the marshes and weave them into mats. These are sold in the markets, and form an important source of their income. You can see the people weaving beside their tents. They also breed buffalies(sic) which can be seen basking in the swamps near the springs. This part of the country is rich in this type of cattle."

In a report to Haganah General Staff, dated 22 April 1948, Allon recommended: "an attempt to clear the beduins encamped between the Jordan, and Jubb Yusuf and the Sea of Galilee". The area was home to five Bedouin clans: al-Qudayriyya, 'Arab as Samakiya, 'Arab as Suyyad, Arab al-Shamalina and the al-Zanghariyya. These had for months harassed Jewish traffic on the Tiberias - Rosh-Pina road.

Operation
The Operational orders were:
The destruction of bases of the enemy, who sabotages and harasses our traffic in the Galilee
To destroy points of assembly for invading forces from east
To join the lower and upper Galilee with a relatively wide and safe strip.

The company commanders who attacked the villages of Zanghariya and Tabigha and the area of 'Arab ash Shamalina' also had orders that "their inhabitants [be] expelled and houses blown up", though friendly Arabs and churches "should on no account be harmed."  The attack was launched on 4 May 1948. The assault on Zanghariya was preceded by mortaring and the Arabs fled eastward into Syria. The following day Palmach sappers 'methodically blew up more than 50 houses' in the area. 

The Yiftah Logbook records on 4 May that: "The operation is going according to plan and at 9.00 o'clock (a.m.?) the units reached their objectives as, on the way, they blow up all the houses and burn all the bedouin tents."

Aftermath
A cable to the British Foreign Office, dated 4 May, quoted Syrian sources that 2,000 refugees had crossed the border. According to Yigal Allon, Operation Broom had a "tremendous psychological impact" on the population of Safed and of the Hula Valley to the north.

Communities captured during Operation Matateh
Population figures based on year-end 1944 figures from the Village Statistics 1945 - Palestine Index Gazetteer.

See also
 Depopulated Palestinian locations in Israel

References

Bibliography

 Morris, Benny, (1987) The Birth of the Palestinian refugee problem, 1947–1949, .

Matate|Broom
May 1948 events in Asia
Haganah
Sea of Galilee